Nienbüttel is a municipality in the district of Steinburg, in Schleswig-Holstein, Germany.

References

Steinburg

vi:Oeschebüttel